Nicki Minaj has recorded songs for four studio albums, one re-issue and three mixtapes, some of which were collaborations with other performers. Her debut album, Pink Friday, was released in November 2010. "Your Love" was released as the lead single; it contains a sample of British singer-songwriter Annie Lennox's song "No More I Love You's". Minaj wrote the songs "Roman's Revenge" (which features American rapper Eminem) and "Here I Am" in collaboration with producer Swizz Beatz. "Roman's Revenge" references both artists' alter-egos, Roman Zolanski for Minaj and Slim Shady for Eminem. She co-wrote the song "Did It On'em" with Grammy Award-winning American producer Bangladesh, alongside Justin Ellington and Safaree Lloyd Samuels. Minaj and J. R. Rotem worked together on the seventh and eighth single releases "Girls Fall Like Dominoes" and "Fly", which features Barbadian recording artist Rihanna. On "Girls Fall Like Dominoes", Minaj raps about how she can steal fans from male artists in the music industry, specifically Lil Wayne and Drake. Rihanna's contribution to the "inspirational" ballad "Fly" was added at Minaj's request, as noted by Jayson Rodriquez writing for MTV News. Andrew "Pop" Wansel and Warren "Oak" Felder co-wrote three tracks with Minaj, including "Your Love", "Save Me" and "Muny".

Minaj released her second studio album, Pink Friday: Roman Reloaded, in April 2012. The lead single, "Starships", is a hybrid of genres, combining Eurodance, Europop and Euro house. It was written by Minaj in collaboration with Wayne Hector and its producers Carl Falk, RedOne and Rami Yacoub. They also wrote the songs "Pound the Alarm", "Whip It" and "Automatic" together. "Pound the Alarm" became her first song as a lead artist to peak at number one on the United States' Hot Dance Club Songs. Minaj reunited with Andrew "Pop" Wansel and Warren "Oak" Felder on the songs "Right by My Side" featuring Chris Brown and "Fire Burns". Critics noted how Minaj sings in addition to rapping on "Right by My Side", and described it as an upbeat take on a downtempo pop ballad. Minaj wrote the song "Marilyn Monroe" in collaboration with Ross Golan and its producers J. R. Rotem and production team Dreamlab. The American actress Marilyn Monroe is mentioned numerous times throughout the song, and its lyrics are inspired by a famous quote "I'm selfish, impatient and a little insecure. I make mistakes, I am out of control and at times hard to handle. But if you can't handle me at my worst, then you sure as hell don't deserve me at my best"; which is incorrectly attributed to Monroe.

In November 2012, the rapper released Pink Friday: Roman Reloaded – The Re-Up, a re-issue of her second studio album. In addition to the songs from Pink Friday: Roman Reloaded, the album includes an additional seven new songs recorded by Minaj. "Va Va Voom" was included on Pink Friday: Roman Reloaded as a deluxe edition bonus track, but was included on the standard track listing of Pink Friday: Roman Reloaded – The Re-Up and released as a single from both albums. Minaj wrote the song in collaboration with Dr. Luke and Cirkut. "The Boys", a duet with American recording artist Cassie, was released as Pink Friday: Roman Reloaded – The Re-Ups lead single. It combines a fusion of genres including dancehall and folk music. Other featured artists include Parker on "Hell Yeah" and Ciara on "I'm Legit". "High School", which features Lil Wayne, has a running theme of adultery.

Minaj's third studio album, The Pinkprint, was released in December 2014. It included songs such as "Anaconda," "Pills N Potions," "Only," and "Bed of Lies."

In August 2018, Minaj released her long-delayed fourth studio album, Queen, which was preceded by singles "Chun-Li," "Barbie Tingz," "Bed," and promotional single "Rich Sex." "Barbie Dreams" was released as the fourth single after the album's release. The album includes features from several artists, including Eminem ("Majesty"), Ariana Grande ("Bed"), Lil Wayne ("Rich Sex"), Foxy Brown ("Coco Chanel") and The Weeknd ("Thought I Knew You").

Minaj accomplished her first number one hit on the Billboard Hot 100 in May 2020, with the release of Doja Cat's "Say So (Remix)." Minaj's following single "TROLLZ," which is co-led by previous collaborator 6ix9ine, also reached the top of the chart.

Songs

Unreleased songs

See also
Nicki Minaj discography

Notes

References

 
Minaj, Nicki